Kaas chante Piaf is the ninth studio album by French singer Patricia Kaas. In most part it consists of songs firstly performed by French cabaret singer Édith Piaf.

Track listing

Charts

Weekly charts

Year-end charts

Certifications and sales

References

2012 albums
Patricia Kaas albums
Tribute albums